Men's Combined World Cup 1992/1993

Final point standings
In Men's Combined World Cup 1992/93 all three results count. Marc Girardelli won his third Combined World Cup by winning all three competitions.

Note:

In all races not all points were awarded (not enough finishers).

World Cup
FIS Alpine Ski World Cup men's combined discipline titles